Raj News Kannada is a 24-hour Kannada news channel news  presented by Chennai-based Raj Television Network in Karnataka.It is taken over by Shivashri media pvt ltd from January 2021.It is available on major DTH platform videcon d2h-2691,Tatasky-1658, Airtel-983. and all cable networks

See also
List of Kannada-language television channels
Television in India
Media in Karnataka
Media of India

References
 Raj News Kannada Website

Kannada-language television channels
Television stations in Bangalore
Year of establishment missing